The Poind and his Man is a prehistoric site in Northumberland, England, near the village of Bolam and about  west of Morpeth. The site, consisting of a burial mound and a standing stone, is a scheduled monument.

Description
The burial mound, described as a round cairn, is situated on a small knoll. It dates from the Late Neolithic to Early Bronze Age.

A standing stone, height , is next to the mound; it was formerly one of two such stones ("the poind and his man"). The standing stone in the grounds of Wallington Hall is thought to have been moved from here in the early 18th century.

The mound was partly excavated in the 18th century by John Warburton. He found a cist near the top of the centre of the mound.

Archaeological sites nearby
 Huckhoe Settlement, an Iron Age and Romano-British site
 Shaftoe Crags Settlement, a Romano-British site
 Slate Hill Settlement, an Iron Age site

References

Barrows in England
Scheduled monuments in Northumberland
Archaeological sites in Northumberland
Belsay